The White Days or Ayyām al-Bīḍ are specific days of each Islamic month; they are holy days according to the Islamic prophet, Muhammad. These days are the 13th, 14th and 15th of every month in the Islamic calendar. Shia Muslims believe that the white days of the lunar months of Rajab, Sha'ban and Ramadan are very virtuous. They are called the white days because of the colour of the full moon on these days. The moon becomes very white and can be seen by the naked eye.

About the idiom 
In the idiom Ayyam al-Beed, Ayyam is the Arabic plural of "", meaning "days" and al-Beed is the Arabic plural of "", meaning "white" and "bright". "The white days" is its equivalent to English.

Etymology 
There are couple of views on the etymology of this idiom:

 One is that due to the fact that the nights in these three days are bright and white due to the fullness of the moon, the days of these three nights have been called the Ayyam al-Beed meaning the white days.

Acts of the white days 
According to the Muslims, the most important practices in these three days are "Iʿtikāf" and "fasting".

Fasting 
Fasting on the white days is Mustahabb (duties recommended, but not essential). The reward for fasting is as great as fasting all the days of the year, when the fasting of these days continues, then the reward for fasting three days is equivalent to fasting a month, which is a good ten times more than without harming or damaging the fast of the whole month. There is a source in Hadith (by) Abu Dharr, may God be pleased with him, who said: The Prophet Muhammad, may Allah's peace and blessings be upon him, said to him: "If you fast from the month three days, then thirteen, fourteenth, and fifteen." From the month three days, a good deed is ten times the same, such as fasting an eternity ... and it is narrated that "the Prophet, may God’s prayers and peace be upon him, used to fast for several three days of every month."

See also

Resources 

Islamic theology
Islamic terminology
Islamic practices
Webarchive template wayback links